Darcina Manuel (born 24 September 1992) is a New Zealand judoka. She competed in the Women's 57 kg event at the 2014 Commonwealth Games where she won a bronze medal.

Of Māori descent, Manuel affiliates to the Ngāti Porou iwi.

References

External links

1992 births
Living people
New Zealand female judoka
Commonwealth Games bronze medallists for New Zealand
Judoka at the 2014 Commonwealth Games
Judoka at the 2016 Summer Olympics
Olympic judoka of New Zealand
Ngāti Porou people
Commonwealth Games medallists in judo
Medallists at the 2014 Commonwealth Games